The men's individual recurve competition at the 2015 World Archery Championships took place from 27 July to 2 August 2015 in Copenhagen, Denmark. The reigning champion and world number one archer Lee Seung-yun was not selected for the South Korean team, so did not compete.

The top 8 competitors, excluding those whose countries earned team qualifying spots in the team event, earned an individual qualifying spot for their country for the 2016 Summer Olympics. Only one spot per country could be earned this way. An Olympic Secondary Tournament was held to rank competitors reaching the same round.

Schedule
All times are local (UTC+01:00).

Qualification round
Pre-tournament world rankings ('WR') are taken from the 18 July 2015 World Archery Rankings.

 Bye to third round 
 Qualified for eliminations

Elimination rounds

Top Half

Section 1

Section 2

Section 3

Section 4

Bottom Half

Section 5

Section 6

Section 7

Section 8

Finals

References

2015 World Archery Championships